The 2015 Sparkassen Giro featured as the seventh round of the 2015 UCI Women's Road World Cup. It was held on 2 August 2015, in Bochum, Germany. Barbara Guarischi won, beating Lucinda Brand and Emilie Moberg.

Results

World Cup Standings

References

Sparkassen Giro
Sparkassen Giro
Sparkassen Giro